Gregoir, Bishop of Dunkeld (died 1169), served as Bishop of Dunkeld in the middle of the 12th century. Before being raised to the bishopric by King 
David I of Scotland, he was the abbot of Dunkeld. King David entrusted certain lands to Gregory, who was to hold them until there were canons on the island of St. Colme's Inch, a charge accomplished before 1169. The lands so entrusted included the island itself, “Kincarnathar” (probably Nether Kincairney), and Donibristle. Gregory appears in a great number of charters dating to the reigns of David I and Máel Coluim IV of Scotland, the earliest of which may date to 1135, although 1146 is the first firm date, when he appears alongside Bishop Andreas of Caithness in the Gaelic notitiae on the Book of Deer. He is not the last Gaelic bishop of the diocese, but his death marks the end of dominance of the bishopric by principally Gaelic-speaking bishops.

References

Dowden, John, The Bishops of Scotland, ed. J. Maitland Thomson, (Glasgow, 1912), pp. 48–9
Jackson, Kenneth H. (ed), The Gaelic Notes in the Book of Deer (The Osborn Bergin Memorial Lecture 1970), (Cambridge, 1972), p. 80
Lawrie, Sir Archibald, Early Scottish Charters Prior to A.D. 1153, (Glasgow, 1905), pp. 80, 102, 141, 147, 164, 167, 171, 179–182, 187, 195, 210, 212, 419, 425

External links
Dauvit Broun's list of 12th century Scottish Bishops

Medieval Gaels from Scotland
People from Perth and Kinross
Bishops of Dunkeld (pre-Reformation)
12th-century Scottish Roman Catholic bishops
1169 deaths
Year of birth unknown